Dazzle-ships in Drydock at Liverpool is a 1919 oil painting by the English artist Edward Wadsworth. It is one of Wadsworth's most famous paintings and depicts a freshly painted vessel with dazzle camouflage in dry dock.

Creation
Wadsworth had been involved with Vorticism, an abstract art movement led by Wyndham Lewis, before he was employed to design dazzle camouflage for ships during World War I. This experience forms the background for Dazzle-ships in Drydock at Liverpool.

Legacy
The graphic designer Peter Saville was struck by the painting and suggested the title for the album Dazzle Ships by Orchestral Manoeuvres in the Dark. Saville designed the album's cover and used Wadsworth's painting as inspiration.

References

Further reading

External links
 Dazzle-ships in Drydock at Liverpool at the National Gallery of Canada

1919 paintings
Collections of the National Gallery of Canada
Paintings by Edward Wadsworth
Liverpool